Divis is a surname. Notable people with the surname include:

 Reinhard Divis (born 1975), Austrian ice hockey player
 Moxie Divis (1894–1955), American baseball outfielder
 Tania (tango singer) (1893–1999), Spanish tango singer

See also
 Davis (surname)
 Diviš